19 Polk is a bus route operated by the San Francisco Municipal Railway (Muni). It runs from Ghirardelli Square in the north to Hunters Point in the south via Russian Hill, Nob Hill, the Tenderloin, South of Market, India Basin, and Potrero Hill.

Route
The northern end of the line operates on Polk Street, turning around Ghirardelli Square for return trips. The southern end begins at Galvez Avenue and Hill Drive, running inbound via Galvez, Donnahue, Innes, Hunters Point Boulevard, Evans, and Cesar Chavez. Northbound and southbound buses run on a largely different route in their middle sections. Southbound buses continue on Polk past Geary to their route on Eddy, Hyde, 8th, Division, Rhode Island, 26th, Wisconsin, 25th, Connecticut, then on to the southern routing at Cesar Chavez. Northbound trips run on Connecticut, Wisconsin, 26th, Kansas, 23rd, De Haro, 16th, Rhode Island, Division, Townsend, 7th, Market, Hayes, Larkin, and Geary to meet up on Polk.

History
Sutter Street Railway established cable car service on Polk Street between Post and Pacific in 1883. Cable service was replaced with electric streetcars in 1907. Streetcar service was initially abandoned in June 1939 to save money on two-man operation, but rush hour service was reinstated with one-man cars in 1940. Following high demand for service during World War II, all trips were replaced with buses in 1945. (Tracks remained in place until at least 1948.)

An extension of the line south on Rhode Island and 23rd to Potrero Hill began in November 1969 on a trial basis. The 87X Civic Center Express operated over the 19 Polk route between 4th and King Street station and the Civic Center for eleven months starting in July 1979. The extension to India Basin began on September 10, 1980 as part of Muni's 5-Year Plan which was then being implemented. This ended the line's service to the Southern Pacific depot.

References

Bibliography

External links

 19 Polk — via SFMTA

San Francisco Municipal Railway bus routes
Railway lines opened in 1883
Railway lines closed in 1945